Chris Waller (born 5 March 1974), is a Hall of Fame trainer in Australian Thoroughbred racing best known for training the racemare Winx, a four-time winner of Australian Horse of the Year honours.

Background

Chris Waller grew up on his parents' dairy farm in Himatangi, near Palmerston North. He became interested in racing watching horses such as Melbourne Cup winner Kiwi and jockeys such as Jimmy Cassidy. 

Waller worked for Foxton-based horse trainer, Patrick ("Paddy") Busuttin who was known for his top stayer Castletown. He progressed to stable foreman and when Busuttin moved to Singapore, Waller commenced training on his own account.  His first winner was Go Morgan at Trentham Racecourse in 1997.

On 12 February 2000, he won the Group 3 Dunedin Gold Cup (2400m) at Wingatui with Ripon By, for the Dawn Fox's syndicate.

Party Belle

In 1998, Waller took a horse called Party Belle to New South Wales to race. She won three races in Australia, a 2100m maiden at Wyong in September 1998 (ridden by Opie Bosson), followed by a Class 1 and a Class 2 at Kembla Grange before attempting but failing in a listed race at Randwick. Party Belle then raced in New Zealand unsuccessfully before Waller took her back to Sydney the following winter when, she won three more races in May 1999 at Randwick and Warwick Farm, ridden by Larry Cassidy.

Training in Australia
 
Waller applied for and obtained 20 horse boxes at Rosehill and commenced training there in 2000. Initially he had limited funds but he build his training operation up over time.  His first Group 1 winner came in April 2008 when he won the Doncaster Handicap with Triple Honour (NZ).

He extended his operation with stables at Flemington, the Gold Coast and Warwick Farm.

On 24 April 2021, Chris brought up 125 Group 1 victories when Kolding won the All Aged Stakes at Randwick.

On 2 November 2021 Waller won his first Melbourne Cup with his horse Verry Elleegant.

Group 1 Winners (145)

 All Aged Stakes (2) - Danleigh (2009); Kolding (2021)
 Australian Cup (1) - Preferment (2016)
 Australasian Oaks (2) - Egg Tart (2017); Toffee Tongue (2020)
 Australian Oaks (4) - Royal Descent (2013); Unforgotten (2018); Verry Elleegant (2019); Hungry Heart (2021)
 Cantala Stakes (4) - Albert The Fat (2011); Boban (2013); Shillelagh (2017); Yulong Prince (2020)
 Caulfield Cup (2) - Verry Elleegant (2020); Durston (2022)
 Caulfield Guineas (2) - Press Statement (2015); The Autumn Sun (2018)
 Caulfield Stakes (1) - Winx (2016)
 Chipping Norton Stakes (10) - Danleigh (2011); Shoot Out (2012); Shoot Out (2013); Boban (2014); Winx (2016); Winx (2017); Winx (2018); Winx (2019); Verry Elleegant (2021); Verry Elleegant (2022)
 Coolmore Classic (1) - Espiona (2023)
 Coolmore Stud Stakes (5) - Zoustar (2013); Brazen Beau (2014); Japonisme (2015); September Run (2020); Home Affairs (2021)
 Cox Plate (4) - Winx (2015); Winx (2016); Winx (2017); Winx (2018)
 Darley Classic (3) - Delectation (2015); Nature Strip (2019); Nature Strip (2021)
 Doncaster Handicap (6) - Triple Honour (2008); Rangirangdoo (2010); Sacred Falls (2013); Sacred Falls (2014); Kermadec (2015); Winx (2016)
 Doomben 10,000 (1) - Boban (2015)
 Doomben Cup (3) - Metal Bender (2010); Beaten Up (2013); Comin' Through (2018)
 Empire Rose Stakes (2) - Red Tracer (2013); Shillelagh (2018)
 Epsom Handicap (4) - Boban (2013); He's Your Man (2014); Winx (2015); Kolding (2019)
 Flight Stakes (2) - Funstar (2019); Zougotcha (2022)
 The Galaxy (2) - Shellscrape (2010); Nature Strip (2019)
 George Main Stakes (8) - Shoot Out (2012); Sacred Falls (2014); Kermadec (2015); Winx (2016); Winx (2017); Winx (2018); Kolding (2020); Verry Elleegant  (2021)
 George Ryder Stakes (7) - Danleigh (2010); Rangirangdoo (2011); Metal Bender (2012); Winx (2016); Winx (2017); Winx (2018); Winx (2019)
 Golden Rose Stakes (2) - Zoustar (2013); The Autumn Sun (2018)
 Golden Slipper (1)
- Shinzo (2023)
 J. J. Atkins (3) - Pressday (2010); Press Statement (2015); The Autumn Sun (2018)
 King's Stand Stakes (1) - Nature Strip (2022)
 Kingston Town Classic (1) - Moriarty (2014)
 Lightning Stakes (2) - Nature Strip (2021); Home Affairs (2022)
 Makybe Diva Stakes (1) - Foreteller (2013)
 Manikato Stakes (1) - Danleigh (2009)
 Melbourne Cup (1) - Verry Elleegant (2021)
 Memsie Stakes (1) - Boban (2015)
 The Metropolitan (5) - The Verminator (2011); Opinion (2014); Patrick Erin (2018); Come Play With Me (2019); No Compromise (2022)
 Moir Stakes (1) - Nature Strip (2019)
 Newmarket Handicap (1) - Brazen Beau (2015)
 Queen Elizabeth Stakes (5) - My Kingdom of Fife (2011); Reliable Man (2013); Winx (2017); Winx (2018); Winx (2019)
 Queen of the Turf Stakes (1) - Foxwedge (2017)
 Queensland Derby (2) - Hawkspur (2013); Kukeracha (2021)
 Queensland Oaks (3) - Winx (2015); Egg Tart (2017); Youngstar (2018)
 Railway Stakes (1) - Good Project (2015)
 Randwick Guineas (1) - The Autumn Sun (2018)
 Ranvet Stakes (2) - Foreteller (2013), Verry Elleegant (2021)
 Rosehill Guineas (3) - D'Argento (2018); The Autumn Sun (2019); Lindermann (2023)
 Spring Champion Stakes (1) - Vanbrugh (2015)
 Surround Stakes (1) - Hinged (2022)
 Sydney Cup (5) - Stand to Gain (2011) ; Grand Marshal (2015); Who Shot Thebarman (2018); Shraaoh (2019); Selino (2021)
 Tancred Stakes -  (2) Preferment (2016); Verry Elleegant (2020)
 Tattersall's Tiara (2) - Red Tracer (2013); Invincibella (2019)
 Thousand Guineas (2) - Amicus (2014), Madame Pommery (2022)
 TJ Smith Stakes (3) - Nature Strip (2020); Nature Strip (2021); Nature Strip (2022)
 Turnbull Stakes (5) - Preferment (2015); Winx (2017); Winx (2018); Kings Will Dream (2019); Verry Elleegant (2020)
 Underwood Stakes (1) - Foreteller (2013)
 Victoria Derby (2) - Preferment (2014); Manzoice (2022)
 Vinery Stud Stakes (3) - Verry Elleegant (2019); Hungry Heart (2021); Fangirl (2022)
 William Reid Stakes (1) - September Run (2022)
 Winx Stakes (2) - Winx (2018); Verry Elleegant (2020)

See also

 Thoroughbred racing in Australia
 Thoroughbred racing in New Zealand

References 

1974 births
Living people
People from Foxton, New Zealand
New Zealand racehorse trainers
New Zealand Racing Hall of Fame inductees 
Australian Thoroughbred Racing Hall of Fame inductees